Ramanakoppa is a village in Dharwad district of Karnataka, India.

Demographics 
As of the 2011 Census of India there were 325 households in Ramanakoppa and a total population of 1,720 consisting of 901 males and 819 females. There were 236 children ages 0-6.

References

Villages in Dharwad district